Our Lady of Fatima Church or variations with Parish or other may refer to:

in India
the church of the Our Lady of Fatima Convent High School, in Patiala, in Punjab
Our Lady of Fatima Church, Kallukoottam, Kanyakumari, Tamil Nadu
Our Lady of Fatima Church, Krishnagiri, Tamil Nadu

in London
Our Lady of Fatima Church, White City

in Macau
Our Lady of Fátima Church Macau

in Pakistan
Our Lady of Fatima Church, Karachi

in Portugal
Sanctuary of Fátima, the basilica in Fátima

in the United States
Basilica of The National Shrine of Our Lady of Fatima (Lewiston New York)
Our Lady of Fatima Church (Bridgeport, Connecticut)
Our Lady of Fatima Church (Chinle, Arizona)

See also
Cathedral of Our Lady of Fatima (disambiguation)